Denzel Dominique Whitaker (born June 15, 1990) is an American actor. Beginning his career as a child actor, he acted in the films Training Day (2001) and The Ant Bully (2006) before portraying James Farmer Jr. in The Great Debaters (2007), earning an NAACP Image Award for his work in the film. His other film work includes My Soul to Take (2010), Abduction (2011) and Black Panther (2018).

On television, Whitaker was a cast member on Nickelodeon's All That between 2004 to 2005. He has appeared in recurring roles on Brothers & Sisters (2009) and The Purge (2019), in addition to guest roles on various series.

Early life
Whitaker was born on June 15, 1990 in Torrance, California, the son of Younalanda and Dale Whitaker. He went to Palos Verdes Peninsula High School, but while acting as a teenager he would receive and conduct schoolwork via email correspondence.

He was named after actor Denzel Washington. Whitaker disputed this fact on The Oprah Winfrey Show while promoting the movie The Great Debaters, only to learn later from his father that, in fact, Washington was his namesake. Washington would later serve as an acting mentor for Whitaker on The Great Debaters.

Career
Whitaker made his acting debut in the 2001 film Training Day as Dimitri. He was a regular cast member during the tenth and final season of the Nickelodeon sketch-comedy series All That.

He portrayed James Farmer Jr. in The Great Debaters (2007). Whitaker's acting in this film was well received, with one reviewer praising his "sweetness and vulnerability" and another describing him as a standout among the younger actors in the film. For his performance as James, Whitaker won the 2008 NAACP Image Award for Outstanding Supporting Actor in a Motion Picture, and received a Young Artist Award nomination.

Whitaker played Sheldon in the Disney Channel Original Movie Dadnapped (2009). Whitaker was a blind teenager named Jerome in Wes Craven's My Soul to Take (2010). In 2011, he performed in two feature films, portraying Gilly in thriller Abduction and appearing in sports drama Warrior.

Whitaker appeared as Eddie in thriller Submerged (2016) and was a young Zuri in the 2018 superhero film Black Panther. He portrayed Andre, an aspiring musician, in the 2020 film Cut Throat City, directed by rapper RZA.

His television work includes ER, The Suite Life of Zack & Cody, The War at Home, Rizzoli & Isles and Blue Bloods. Whitaker also appeared in Werner Herzog's Bad Lieutenant: Port of Call New Orleans.

As a voice actor, Whitaker provided the voice of Albert in The Ant Bully (2006) and portrayed Kyle in preschool series Handy Manny. In the third season of The Boondocks, Whitaker gave voice to Sgt. Gutte, and on Black Dynamite: The Animated Series he played Donald the Accountant.

He has also worked as an assistant voice director for the 2010 film Freaknik: The Musical. Whitaker has directed films and music videos as well.

Filmography

Film

Television

References

External links

1990 births
Living people
21st-century American male actors
American male child actors
American male film actors
Actors from Torrance, California
African-American male actors
American male television actors
American male voice actors
American voice directors
21st-century African-American people